Masako Hozumi (born 11 September 1986, in Fukushima) is a Japanese speed skater from Hokkaido. In 2009, she finished fourth overall at the 2009 Allround. She competed for Japan at the 2010 and 2014 Winter Olympics.

She is named after Masako Natsume, a famous Japanese actress.

References

External links 
 
 

1986 births
Japanese female speed skaters
Speed skaters at the 2010 Winter Olympics
Speed skaters at the 2014 Winter Olympics
Olympic speed skaters of Japan
Medalists at the 2010 Winter Olympics
Olympic medalists in speed skating
Olympic silver medalists for Japan
Speed skaters at the 2007 Asian Winter Games
Speed skaters at the 2011 Asian Winter Games
Medalists at the 2007 Asian Winter Games
Medalists at the 2011 Asian Winter Games
Asian Games medalists in speed skating
Asian Games gold medalists for Japan
Asian Games silver medalists for Japan
Sportspeople from Fukushima Prefecture
Living people
World Single Distances Speed Skating Championships medalists
20th-century Japanese women
21st-century Japanese women